Heinrich von Nutzhorn  (February 20, 1833 – 1925) was a Danish composer.

See also
List of Danish composers

References
This article was initially translated from the Danish Wikipedia.

Danish composers
Male composers
1833 births
1925 deaths